Whittlesey Creek is a creek that flows through Bayfield County, Wisconsin. The source of the creek is northeast of Moquah and flows into Lake Superior north of Ashland Junction. As of 2010,  of land in the watershed belong to the Whittlesey Creek National Wildlife Refuge. The creek is named after Asaph Whittlesey, who was the first settler of Ashland and a member of the Wisconsin State Assembly.

See also
List of rivers of Wisconsin

References

Rivers of Wisconsin
Tributaries of Lake Superior